Raman Abdullah is a 1997 Indian Tamil-language comedy film directed by Balu Mahendra, starring Sivakumar, Karan and Vignesh. It is a remake of the 1994 Malayalam film Malappuram Haji Mahanaya Joji. The film was released on 22 August 1997.

Plot 

Friends Abdullah and Raman go through misadventures to save their face from a strict Hajji.

Cast 
 Sivakumar as Hajjiar
 Karan as Abdullah
 Vignesh as Raman
 Easwari Rao as Gowri
 Rudra as Ayesha
 Prithviraj
 Charle
 Amarasigamani
 Delhi Ganesh
 Kitty
 Naren
 Chokkalinga Bhagavathar
 Vaiyapuri

Production 
Director Balu Mahendra had offered a leading role to actor Vikram, who was unable to take up the offer as a result of schedule clashes with his work in Ullaasam (1997). The film's shoot became the epicentre of a dispute that arose between the Tamil Film Producers Council and Film Employees Federation of South India (FEFSI). It was reported that members of FEFSI had stopped the filming of Raman Abdullah as Mahendra was engaging outside cast members in the film. This led FEFSI to go for an indefinite strike which affected to the delaying of several Tamil films. During production, the makers had to change the name of the film from Abdul Raaman to Raman Abdullah following protests from the Muslim community.

Soundtrack 
The music was composed by Ilaiyaraaja.

Reception 
The film was a commercial failure.

References

External links 
 

1990s Tamil-language films
1997 comedy films
1997 films
Films directed by Balu Mahendra
Films scored by Ilaiyaraaja
Indian comedy films
Tamil remakes of Malayalam films